Russell Allen (born 1971) is the singer of the American progressive metal band Symphony X.

Russell Allen may also refer to:

 Russell Allen (American football) (born 1986), American football player
 Russell Allen (footballer) (born 1954), English former footballer
 Russell Allen (cyclist) (1913–2012), American cyclist

See also
Russell Ellen (born 1954), Australian footballer

Allen (surname)